James Murray Costello  (born February 24, 1934) is a Canadian retired ice hockey player, executive and administrator who dedicated a lifetime to the advancement of ice hockey in Canada. He played four seasons in the National Hockey League, and was the younger brother of Les Costello. He was a lawyer by trade, and was president of the Canadian Amateur Hockey Association from 1979 to 1994, then and its successor Hockey Canada from 1994 to 1998, when he facilitated the merger of the two organizations.

Costello helped establish the program of excellence for the Canada men's national junior ice hockey team, and oversaw the foundation of the Canada women's national ice hockey team, and the inaugural 1990 IIHF Women's World Championship. In addition to his work on Canadian national hockey, he spent 15 seasons as an executive in the Western Hockey League, and another 14 years as an International Ice Hockey Federation council member. Costello is inducted into the Hockey Hall of Fame, the IIHF Hall of Fame, Canada's Sports Hall of Fame, and is an Officer of the Order of Canada, and a recipient of the Order of Hockey in Canada.

Early life
Costello was born in South Porcupine, Ontario. His given name was James. He grew up in Schumacher, Ontario, in a household with three brothers, one sister, and a father who worked at the Dome Mine.

Playing career

Costello was noticed by scouts as a teen and was convinced by his older brother Les, to enrol at St. Michael's College School, to play hockey to pay for his education. He played three seasons of junior ice hockey with the Toronto St. Michael's Majors in the Ontario Hockey Association, reaching the J. Ross Robertson Cup finals in the 1952–53 OHA season. 

Costello was signed by the Chicago Black Hawks in 1953, and was assigned to their affiliate team, the Galt Black Hawks, for the 1953–54 OHA season. Costello made his professional debut in the 1953–54 NHL season, playing 40 games with Chicago. He finished the season with the Hershey Bears in the American Hockey League, reaching the Calder Cup finals in the 1953–54 AHL season. He was traded to the Boston Bruins for Frank Martin, on October 4, 1954. Costello played 54 games for the Bruins in the 1954–55 NHL season, and 41 games in the 1955–56 NHL season, when he and Lorne Ferguson were traded to the Detroit Red Wings, in exchange for Real Chevrefils and Jerry Toppazzini on January 17, 1956. After 27 games for Detroit without any points, Costello was sent down to the Edmonton Flyers early in the following season, where he finished his professional career. He played 162 games in four seasons in the NHL, and scored 13 goals, 19 assists, and 32 points. 

Costello felt that he had the skills to play in the NHL, but not "the mindset to be an NHL player, the way they sacrificed their bodies.” Costello finished his playing career with the Windsor Bulldogs in OHA senior hockey, while he earned a Bachelor of Arts degree from Assumption University in 1959.

From Seattle to Ottawa
After graduation, Costello moved to Seattle, working as the marketing director of the Seattle Totems, and stayed for 15 years. He later became publicity director for the Western Hockey League itself. Costello rose up the ranks to become director of hockey operations for the Totems, and his team won consecutive Lester Patrick Cup championships in 1967, and 1968. He moved to Ottawa in 1973, did contract work with the Canadian Amateur Hockey Association teaching and working on coaching certification programs, worked as a scout for the Phoenix Roadrunners, and studied at the University of Ottawa Faculty of Law. He completed his law degree in 1977, then worked in the legal department of the Canadian Radio-television and Telecommunications Commission, and later as an arbitrator for the World Hockey Association Players’ Association. Costello was formally called to the bar on April 9, 1979.

CAHA and Hockey Canada

Costello was recruited to become the first paid staff to lead the Canadian Amateur Hockey Association (CAHA) in 1979, when it was decided to have a full-time president instead of volunteers. He was chosen because he had previously worked for the CAHA on contract work, and had a legal background. He succeeded Gord Renwick as CAHA president. When he originally accepted the job, he understood it to be a five-year commitment, but that evolved into a lifetime career.

The first major project by Costello was to address the lack of success by the Canada men's national junior ice hockey team at the IIHF World U20 Championship. In 1977 Canada won a silver medal, and then a bronze medal in 1978, and from 1979 to 1981, Canada placed no higher than fifth place. The CAHA had usually sent the defending Memorial Cup champion, to save on cost, but often those teams had lost graduating players, and were not as strong of a team which won the championship. The CAHA wanted to send the best team possible, but also feared that by not sending a team, the IIHF would turn to the rival Hockey Canada instead. Costello proposed a "Program of Excellence" at the 1981 CAHA annual general meeting St. John's which entailed, Canada sending the best eligible junior players from the Quebec Major Junior Hockey League, Ontario Hockey League, Western Hockey League, to summer evaluation camp, and lend the same players during Christmas holidays to create a true Team Canada. The program also included creating under–17, and under–18 programs to feed into the juniors (under–20), and inviting eligible Canadian players from other leagues such as the USHL, or NCAA hockey. Teams were concerned about losing their best players in the middle of the season, younger players for regional development tournaments, and potential injuries. Costello said that, “They didn’t want to give up their best players over the holidays because that’s when most of the teams would experience their best crowds. We worked hard at trying to convince them because they could show what their league is to the world, not just Canada.” Costello eventually found key allies in Ed Chynoweth, and Sherwood Bassin. The Canadian Hockey League was also assured of participating in the Program of Excellence policy committee. Once the new program was accepted, it achieved immediate success with Canada winning the gold medal at the 1982 World Junior Ice Hockey Championships. It also proved to create player loyalty to the program, when they wanted to return to play for the Canada men's national ice hockey team.

In 1990, the International Olympic Committee and Juan Antonio Samaranch were looking for ways to increase the number of events in the Winter Olympics for women, and made the suggestion to IIHF president Günther Sabetzki, with the promise that if it was successful, Samaranch would fast-track the sport into the Olympics.  Sabetzki asked Costello if the CAHA would stage a women's world championship, and he agreed as long as it could be hosted close to CAHA offices in Ottawa, to keep expenses down. Costello oversaw the formation of the Canada women's national ice hockey team, and the inaugural 1990 IIHF Women's World Championship, which led to development of women's hockey in Canada,

Costello and Hockey Canada president Bill Hay, negotiated a merger between the two organizations in 1994, under the Canadian Hockey Association name, which has operated as Hockey Canada since 1998. Combining the two groups allowed for the profits from Hockey Canada events such as the Canada Cup, and the Summit Series, to be used at the grassroots level, and it also allowed access by professionals in the NHL to international competitions such as the Ice Hockey World Championships, and eventually the Olympics.

Costello also spoke out against violence in sport, and was a member of the fair play advisory committee for Ontario Hockey Association. In the wake of the Graham James scandal in 1997, Hockey Canada implemented a screening program with background checks for hockey staff, and teamed up with the Canadian Red Cross to create the Speak Out against bullying and harassment, which evolved into the Respect In Sport Program. As president of Hockey Canada, Costello always recognized the volunteers who helped in the development of minor hockey in Canada. He retired as president of Hockey Canada, effective July 1, 1998 at the annual general meeting. He was replaced with vice president, Bob Nicholson, who said that Costello was a great mentor, and "made every decision based on what he thought was the best interest of the sport".

IIHF council member
Costello was a member of the International Ice Hockey Federation council from 1998 to 2012, after retiring from Hockey Canada. He served as chairman of the medical committee for 14 years, chairman of the Under20 committee from 1998 to 2003, chairman of the technical/arena committee from 2003 to 2008, vice president of the IIHF from 2008 to 2012, chairman of the competition committee from 2008 to 2012, sat on the IIHF Hall of Fame committee, and the statutes and bylaws committee. As part of the committees, he oversaw the inspection of Winter Olympic Games ice hockey facilities on behalf of the International Olympic Committee, helped organize international Under-20 tournaments, oversaw random drug testing, and promoted growth of ice hockey worldwide. Costelo resigned as vice president of the IIHF, effective September 30, 2012. He later remarked that "the IIHF is very much a European organization. I don’t think they would give it [the presidency] to a North American or Russian. It would give Canada too much power."

Impact on women's hockey
The 1990 Women's World Cup succeeded in creating media coverage that was lacking for the women's game. Costello says it was partially due to the decision to wear pink jerseys, but he was prouder to have showcased the talent in the women's game to the International Olympic Committee. The championship game of the event drew over 9,500 fans, and the winning goal by Geraldine Heaney, was highlighted as one of the best 10 goals of the year by Hockey Night In Canada. The event's success helped the introduction of the women's game into the 1998 Winter Olympics. As of 2013, registration grew to roughly 90,000 Canadian women. While with the IIHF, Costello promised $2 million to help promote women's hockey worldwide at the 2010 World Hockey Summit. Costello is credited with growing the game worldwide, and specifically in the United States. He facilitated the spread of knowledge and ideas for ice hockey, and collaborated with USA Hockey on coaching education. He was honoured with the Wayne Gretzky International Award in 2012, which was established by the United States Hockey Hall of Fame, for international individuals that made major contributions to the growth and advancement of hockey in the United States.

Personal life
Costello resides in Ottawa with his wife Denise, and they have six children. They met while attending school together in Windsor, and spent their honeymoon in Seattle, when he moved there for work. His older brother Les, played with the Toronto Maple Leafs, was an ordained priest, founded the Flying Fathers in 1963, and died in 2002. 

Costello was on the board of directors for the Hockey Hall of fame for 17 years, and was also on the selection committee. He has also spoken out against the rising cost of minor competitive hockey, calling it an elitist sport. Costello himself was able to reach the NHL coming from a poor background by using hand-me-down equipment, but he fears that "hockey is becoming an opportunity only for the people who can pay their way in", and suggested a return to wooden sticks for minors.

Honours and awards

Career statistics

Regular season and playoffs

Source:

References

Bibliography

External links
 
 YouTube Interview with Murray Costello — Hockey Canada
 YouTube Interview with Murray Costello — IIHF
 Murray Costello's Hockey Hall of Fame induction speech — YouTube

1934 births
Living people
Boston Bruins players
Businesspeople from Ottawa
Canadian Amateur Hockey Association presidents
Canadian sports builders
Canadian sports executives and administrators
Chicago Blackhawks players
Detroit Red Wings players
Edmonton Flyers (WHL) players
Galt Black Hawks players
Hershey Bears players
Hockey Canada presidents
Hockey Hall of Fame inductees
Ice hockey people from Ottawa
IIHF Hall of Fame inductees
Lawyers in Ontario
Officers of the Order of Canada
Order of Hockey in Canada recipients
Sportspeople from Seattle
Sportspeople from Timmins
Toronto St. Michael's Majors players
University of Ottawa Faculty of Law alumni
University of Windsor alumni
Western Hockey League (1952–1974)
Women's ice hockey in Canada
Women's ice hockey in the United States
World Hockey Association executives
Canadian ice hockey centres